ⱺ, or o with low ring inside, is a phonetic character from Landsmålsalfabetet, a phonetic alphabet for the transcription of Swedish dialects. It is used to represent a mid rounded back vowel .

References

 Therese Leinonen, Klaas Ruppel, Erkki I. Kolehmainen and Caroline Sandström, Proposal to encode characters for Ordbok över Finlands svenska folkmål in the UCS, 26 June 2006
 Unicode Character

External links
 Landsmålsalfabetet
 Landsmålsalfabetet at Swedish Wikipedia

Or
Or
Vowel letters